Carew Reynell DD (1698 - 1745)  was an Anglican bishop in the second half of the 18th century.

A Londoner, he was educated at Winchester  and New College, Oxford and held incumbencies in Colerne and Bristol. He was also Chaplain to William Bradshaw, Bishop of Bristol and Chancellor of that diocese. In 1739 he became Chaplain to William Cavendish, 3rd Duke of Devonshire, Lord Lieutenant of Ireland who elevated him to the Bishopric of Down and Connor two years later.

He died on 1 January 1745.

Notes

1698 births
1745 deaths
Anglican clergy from London
Bishops of Down and Connor (Church of Ireland)
18th-century Anglican bishops in Ireland